Homfray is a surname. Notable people with the surname include:

 Don Homfray (1935–2012), production designer
 Francis Homfray (1725–1798), industrialist
 Jeremiah Homfray (1759–1833), ironmaster
 Samuel Homfray (1762–1822), industrialist

See also
 Phillips v Homfray, lawsuit